The 2011 Kōfu International Open was a professional tennis tournament played on hard courts. It was the fourth edition of the tournament which was part of the 2011 ITF Women's Circuit. It took place in Kōfu, Yamanashi, Japan between 3 and 9 October 2011.

WTA entrants

Seeds

 1 Rankings are as of September 26, 2011.

Other entrants
The following players received wildcards into the singles main draw:
  Mai Minokoshi
  Risa Ozaki
  Riko Sawayanagi
  Yuuki Tanaka

The following players received entry from the qualifying draw:
  Mana Ayukawa
  Yumi Miyazaki
  Yuriko Sakai
  Aki Yamasoto

Champions

Singles

 Chang Kai-chen def.  Mandy Minella, 6–4, 1–6, 6–4

Doubles

 Chan Chin-wei /  Hsu Wen-hsin def.  Remi Tezuka /  Akiko Yonemura, 6–3, 6–4

External links
Official Website
ITF Search 

Kofu International Open
Hard court tennis tournaments
Tennis tournaments in Japan
2011 in Japanese tennis
Tourist attractions in Yamanashi Prefecture